Spjutsbygd is a locality situated in Karlskrona Municipality, Blekinge County, Sweden with 383 inhabitants in 2010.

Sports
The following sports clubs are located in Spjutsbygd:

 IF Trion

References 

Populated places in Karlskrona Municipality